14 Greater Poland Infantry Division (Polish: 14 Wielkopolska Dywizja Piechoty) was a unit of the Polish Army in the interbellum period, which took part in the Polish September Campaign.

It was created in January 1919 in Poznań, as part of Polish forces fighting in the Greater Poland Uprising (1918–1919). Its organizer and first commandant was General Filip Dubiski. In the following months, several regiments created in the Greater Poland towns joined the unit, and in the summer of 1919, the Division was sent to the east, to fight the Red Army south of Polotsk. On December 19, 1919, its name was changed from 1st Division of Greater Poland rifles into 14 Greater Poland Infantry Division.

The unit fought in the Polish-Soviet war, and in December 1920, after the truce, it returned to its homeland, to Poznań. According to the Plan Wschod, the Division was supposed to serve as a rear unit, but as in late 1930s German threat became real, on March 23, 1939, the Division became part of newly created Poznań Army, under General Tadeusz Kutrzeba (see: Plan Zachod). Mobilization took place between August 24 and 27.

As the Wehrmacht did not carry out attacks on Greater Poland in the first days of the Polish September Campaign, the Division did not engage in combat until Sept. 8. Then, it took part in the Battle of Bzura, fighting near the town of Piatek and breaking German lines. During the skirmishes, commandant of German 30 I.D, General Kurt von Briesen was injured and the Wehrmacht ordered a retreat. However, the Poles, without air and artillery support, did not take advantage of this breakthrough. Soon afterwards, the Germans counterattacked.

In mid-September the Division tried to cross the Bzura and reach the Kampinos Forest but without success. Only few soldiers managed to do so and hide in the forest. On September 19, the remaining forces broke into besieged Warsaw. There, they fought until capitulation, on Sept. 28.

TO&E

 HQ
 55th Infantry Regiment
 57th Infantry Regiment
 58th Infantry Regiment
 14th Light Artillery Regiment
 14th Heavy Artillery Battalion
 71st AA Artillery Battery
 14th Telephone Company
 71st Mobile HMG Company
 Bicycle Infantry Company
 Divisional Cavalry

See also
 Polish army order of battle in 1939
 Polish contribution to World War II
 1939 Infantry Regiment (Poland)
 List of Polish divisions in World War II

References

14th
14th